Harry Howland Mason (December 16, 1873 – March 10, 1946) was a U.S. Representative from Illinois.

Born on a farm in McLean County, near Farmer City, Illinois, Mason moved to Delavan, with his parents and attended the public schools. He moved to Pawnee, Illinois, in 1903 and engaged in the newspaper publishing business. Mason was a secretary for Congressman J. Earl Major from 1930 to 1933. He served as treasurer of Sangamon County in 1933 and 1934.

Mason was elected as a Democrat to the Seventy-fourth Congress. He was not a candidate for renomination in 1936, and returned to newspaper publishing in Pawnee. He died March 10, 1946, in Springfield, Illinois, and was interred in Prairie Rest Cemetery in Delavan, Illinois.

References

1873 births
1946 deaths
Democratic Party members of the United States House of Representatives from Illinois
People from Sangamon County, Illinois
People from Farmer City, Illinois
People from Delavan, Illinois